The Committee on Employment and Social Affairs (EMPL) is a committee of the European Parliament. It is responsible for issues of employment and social policy, including labour rights, social security, inclusion, free movement for workers and pensioners, professional and vocational training, the European Social Fund, and employment discrimination law. During the Ninth European Parliament (2019–2024), the committee has 55 members. Since 24 January 2022, it is chaired by Dragoș Pîslaru from Romania.

Members
As of 13 April 2022, the 55 members of the committee are:

Chairpersons

References

External links
 EMPL official website

Employment